is a former Japanese football player and manager.

Playing career
Egawa was born in Yokkaichi on January 31, 1966. After graduating from high school, he joined Honda in 1984. He played as regular player as midfielder. The club won the 3rd place in 1985–86 and 1990–91 Japan Soccer League. In 1991, he moved to Toyota Motors (later Nagoya Grampus Eight). Although he played as regular player, his opportunity to play decreased in 1994. In 1995, he moved to Japan Football League club Vissel Kobe. The club won the 2nd place in 1996 and was promoted to J1 League. He retired end of 1997 season.

Futsal career
In 1989, Egawa selected Japan national futsal team for 1989 Futsal World Championship in Netherlands.

Coaching career
In 2002, Egawa became a manager for L.League club Iga FC Kunoichi based in his local Mie Prefecture. He managed the club until 2005.

Club statistics

References

External links

Profile at iga-younet.co.jp

1966 births
Living people
Association football people from Mie Prefecture
Japanese footballers
Japanese men's futsal players
Japan Soccer League players
J1 League players
Japan Football League (1992–1998) players
Honda FC players
Nagoya Grampus players
Vissel Kobe players
Japanese football managers
Association football midfielders